Geoffrey Barry Allen (born 10 November 1946) is an English former professional footballer who played as a left winger.

Career
Born in Walker, Newcastle upon Tyne, Allen played for Newcastle United, making 22 appearances in the Football League, scoring 1 goal. He began his career as a junior and turned professional in February 1964, before making his first-team debut aged 17, in April 1964. He won the Inter-Cities Fairs Cup in 1969.

His career ended aged 23 following an injury, after 26 first-team appearances in all competitions, scoring 1 goal.

He was also an England youth international.

Later life
He later became a football coach, living in Mansfield. His grandson Elliot Anderson is a footballer who plays for Allen's former club, Newcastle United.

References

1946 births
Living people
English footballers
Newcastle United F.C. players
English Football League players
Association football wingers
England youth international footballers
Association football coaches